Nico Mark Julian Reifer (born 11 November 2000) is a Barbadian cricketer. Reifer signed a rookie contract with Surrey in October 2019. Prior to that he made his first appearance for the club's age-grade side at 15. He attended Whitgift School from 2015 and has captained Barbados at youth level. He made his List A debut on 22 July 2021, for Surrey in the 2021 Royal London One-Day Cup. He made his first-class debut on 20 May 2022, for Surrey against the Sri Lanka Cricket Development XI side during their tour of England. He made his Twenty20 debut on 21 June 2022, for Surrey in the 2022 T20 Blast.

References

External links
 

2000 births
Living people
Barbadian cricketers
Surrey cricketers
People from Bridgetown